Scelolyperus lecontii is a species of skeletonizing leaf beetle in the family Chrysomelidae.

References

Further reading

 
 

Galerucinae
Articles created by Qbugbot
Beetles described in 1873
Taxa named by George Robert Crotch